Eduardo Florez (born 20 September 1944) is a Mexican modern pentathlete. He competed at the 1964 Summer Olympics.

References

1944 births
Living people
Mexican male modern pentathletes
Olympic modern pentathletes of Mexico
Modern pentathletes at the 1964 Summer Olympics